Tahlia Randall (born 29 May 1998) is an Australian rules footballer playing for the North Melbourne Football Club in the AFL Women's (AFLW). Randall previously played for the Brisbane Lions from 2017 to 2018, where she received a nomination for the 2018 AFL Women's Rising Star award in round 6 of the 2018 season. She won the AFLW Mark of the Year in 2022, and is also North Melbourne's equal games record holder with 35 games.

Early life
Randall was born in Buderim, Queensland and is of New Zealand descent through her mother, Jenny. She attended Kuluin State School and Mountain Creek State High School. Randall played junior football for the Kawana and Nambour/Maroochydore youth girls teams, and played school football for Mountain Creek, until graduating. She then played for the Wilston Grange Football Club in the Queensland Women's Australian Football League (QWAFL) in 2016 before being drafted.

AFL Women's career

Brisbane (2017–2018)
Randall made her AFL Women's debut in the Lions' inaugural match against  at Casey Fields in round 1 of the 2017 season. She went on to play seven games in her debut season, playing predominantly as a key defender, missing only the round 4 win over  due to a shoulder injury. Brisbane signed Randall for the 2018 season during the trading and signing period in May 2017.

After making a permanent move to the ruck in her second season, Randall had an impressive start to the 2018 season, achieving selection in the team of the week in rounds 2 and 4. She finished the season with the third-most hit-outs in the competition (140), after leading the statistic earlier in the season.

North Melbourne (2019–present)

She remained in the number 16 guernsey that she previously wore for Brisbane. Randall later played for Gold Coast in the inaugural AFL Women's Winter Series in June and July.

Randall returned to her familiar position as a defender at her second club, and made her North Melbourne debut in the club's inaugural match against  at North Hobart Oval in round 1 of the 2019 season. Randall was twice cited by Match Review Officer Michael Christian during the season; she was offered a reprimand for an incident in round 2 and a $400 fine for an incident in round 5. Randall signed a two-year contract with North Melbourne during the trade and sign period in April 2019.

Randall had a good start to the 2021 season, achieving selection in womens.afls Team of the Week in round 1 after accumulating nine spoils. She kicked her first career goal the following week against , and was again named in the Team of the Week. It was revealed she signed on with the club for two more seasons on 17 June 2021, tying her to the club until the end of 2023. Randall achieved selection in Champion Data's 2021 AFLW All-Star stats team, after leading the league for average spoils in the 2021 AFL Women's season, totalling 3.7 a game.

Randall's pack mark in the third quarter of North Melbourne's win over Greater Western Sydney in round 3 of the 2022 season was voted by fans as mark of the round.

Statistics
Updated to the end of the 2022 season.

|- style=background:#EAEAEA
| 2017 ||  || 16
| 7 || 0 || 0 || 32 || 11 || 43 || 14 || 12 || 0.0 || 0.0 || 4.6 || 1.6 || 6.1 || 2.0 || 1.7 || 0
|-
| 2018 ||  || 16
| 8 || 0 || 0 || 37 || 16 || 53 || 9 || 24 || 0.0 || 0.0 || 4.6 || 2.0 || 6.6 || 1.1 || 3.0 || 0
|- style=background:#EAEAEA
| 2019 ||  || 16
| 7 || 0 || 0 || 39 || 10 || 49 || 17 || 18 || 0.0 || 0.0 || 5.6 || 1.4 || 7.0 || 2.4 || 2.6 || 0
|-
| 2020 ||  || 16
| 7 || 0 || 0 || 45 || 10 || 55 || 18 || 14 || 0.0 || 0.0 || 6.4 || 1.4 || 7.9 || 2.6 || 2.0 || 0
|- style=background:#EAEAEA
| 2021 ||  || 16
| 10 || 1 || 0 || 64 || 19 || 83 || 26 || 16 || 0.1 || 0.0 || 6.4 || 1.9 || 8.3 || 2.6 || 1.6 || 1
|-
| 2022 ||  || 16
| 11 || 9 || 9 || 46 || 16 || 62 || 20 || 29 || 0.8 || 0.8 || 4.2 || 1.5 || 5.7 || 1.8 || 2.6 || 0
|- class=sortbottom
! colspan=3 | Career
! 50 !! 10 !! 9 !! 263 !! 82 !! 345 !! 104 !! 113 !! 0.2 !! 0.2 !! 5.3 !! 1.6 !! 6.9 !! 2.1 !! 2.3 !! 1
|}

Honours and achievements
Team
 AFL Women's minor premiership: 2017

Individual
 North Melbourne equal games record holder
 AFLW Mark of the Year: 2022
 AFL Women's Rising Star nominee: 2018

References

External links

 
 
 

1998 births
Living people
Sportswomen from Queensland
Sportspeople from the Sunshine Coast
Australian rules footballers from Queensland
Brisbane Lions (AFLW) players
North Melbourne Football Club (AFLW) players